Owaissa Lake is a lake in geographic Preston Township, Nipissing District in Northeastern Ontario, Canada. It is in Algonquin Provincial Park and is part of the Saint Lawrence River drainage basin.

Owaissa Lake has two unnamed inflows, at the north and southwest. The primary outflow is an unnamed creek at the south, which flows to Shirley Creek. Shirley Creek flows via Crotch Lake, the Opeongo River, the Madawaska River and the Ottawa River to the Saint Lawrence River.

See also
List of lakes in Ontario

References

Lakes of Nipissing District